The 1903 Wimbledon Championships took place on the outdoor grass courts at the All England Lawn Tennis and Croquet Club in Wimbledon, London, United Kingdom. The tournament ran from 22 June until 1 July. It was the 27th staging of the Wimbledon Championships, and the first Grand Slam tennis event of 1903.

Finals

Men's singles

 Laurence Doherty defeated  Frank Riseley, 7–5, 6–3, 6–0

Women's singles

 Dorothea Douglass defeated  Ethel Thomson, 4–6, 6–4, 6–2

Men's doubles

 Laurence Doherty /  Reginald Doherty defeated  Frank Riseley /  Sydney Smith, 6–4, 6–4, 6–4

References

External links
 Official Wimbledon Championships website

 
Wimbledon Championships
Wimbledon Championships
Wimbledon Championships
Wimbledon Championships